Aaha Kalyanam means "Wow Marriage".

Aaha Kalyanam may also refer to:

 Aaha Kalyanam, a 2014 Indian romance film
 Aaha Kalyanam (web series), a 2019 Indian web series